Parliamentary elections were held in Greece on 6 October 1856. Supporters of Dimitrios Voulgaris won a majority of the 138 seats. However, Voulgaris remained Prime Minister only until 25 November the following year, when he was replaced by Athanasios Miaoulis.

References

1856 elections in Europe
1856
1856 in Greece
October 1856 events
1850s in Greek politics